The tenth season of The Bachelor Australia, known as The Bachelors, premiered on 9 January 2023. For the first time in the franchise, this season features three Bachelors: Felix Von Hofe, a 27-year-old marketing manager, sports commentator and former professional NBL player from Melbourne, Victoria; Jed McIntosh, a 25-year-old musician from Gippsland, Victoria and multi-millionaire entrepreneur and co-founder of ACTS Music Group; and Thomas Malucelli, a 35-year-old restaurant manager from Sydney, New South Wales. The season was the first in the series to have been filmed on the Gold Coast in Queensland with the production having previously been traditionally filmed in Sydney, New South Wales.

Contestants
The season began with 30 contestants, who were able to choose which bachelors they wished to court.

Call-out order 

 The contestant received a first impression rose.
 The contestant went on a single date and moved on to the next week by default
 The contestant received a rose outside of a date or the rose ceremony.
 The contestant moved on to the next week by default
 The contestant was eliminated
 The contestant was eliminated during the date
 The contestant was eliminated outside the rose ceremony
 The contestant rejected a rose, but moved to pursue with other bachelor.
 The contestant quit the competition
 The contestant won the competition

Notes

Episodes

Episode 1
Original airdate: 9 January 2023

Note: The Bachelors had 10 roses each, but Jed gave one of his roses to Felix.

Episode 2
Original airdate: 10 January 2023

Episode 3
Original airdate: 11 January 2023

Episode 4
Original airdate: 15 January 2023

Episode 5
Original airdate: 16 January 2023

Episode 6 
Original airdate: 17 January 2023

Note: The girls on the group date where joined by their loved ones.

Episode 7 
Original airdate: 18 January 2023

Episode 8 
Original airdate: 22 January 2023

Episode 9 
Original airdate: 23 January 2023

Episode 10 
Original airdate: 24 January 2023

Episode 11 
Original airdate: 25 January 2023

The Bachelors met the in-laws and friends.

Episode 12 
Original airdate: 29 January 2023

Ratings

References

Australian (season 10)
2023 Australian television seasons
Television shows filmed in Australia